Shanghai Nanyang Model High School, often referred to simply as Nanmo, is one of the oldest modern Chinese schools, founded in 1901 by Sheng Xuanhuai, Minister of Transportation of the Qing dynasty.

As "the beginning of public elementary schools", the school started as the Affiliated Elementary School of Nanyang Public School (now Shanghai Jiaotong University). After over five decades of development and several name changes, in 1958, the name of the school was settled on Nanyang Model High School.

Two generations of national leaders Chairman Mao Zedong and General Secretary Jiang Zemin respectively entitled the Nanmo Student Poster "Qingfeng" ("Young Pioneer") for the Hundred Year Nanmo Message, and "Four Models" – the Model of Curiosity, the Model of Life, the Model of Patriotism, the Model of Aggressiveness. The school motto Diligence, Thrift, Devotion, Honesty, encourages students to form an ethos of solid academic, simple life, sound work, stout body. For a hundred years, the school has practised a teaching style of kindness, justice, strictness, and preciseness, and a study style of veracity, truth, refinement, and innovation with a commitment to foster the "Four Models" exemplary students.

Nanyang Model High School has been the member of Shanghai Experimental and Key Paradigm Schools since 2005. School features includes basketball, Student Art Troupe of Symphony Orchestra, Aesthetic Education, Environmental Protection Practice, National Defense Education, and community services. In January 2012, Nanyang Model High School became a member of World Leading Schools Association.

History

In 1896, Nanyang Public School was founded by an imperial edict issued by Guangxu Emperor, under the Business and Telegraphs Office of the imperial government. Four schools were then established: the Normal School, the School of Foreign Studies, a middle school and a high school.

In 1901, Sheng Xuanhuai, the first president of the school, also the Minister of Transportation responsible for proposing the idea to the Guangxu Emperor, then founded the predecessor of today's Shanghai Nanyang Model High School as an elementary school affiliated to the growing Nanyang Public School, which has now become Shanghai Jiao Tong University, a prestigious school renowned as one of the oldest and most selective universities in China.

The Elementary school affiliated to Nanyang Public School was one of the oldest new type schools in China found by Chinese. In 1927, the school was independent from the university and became private Nanyang Model Elementary/Middle School. Three years later, the senior department of the school was opened. In 1931, the school moved into Tianping campus. This campus is now the junior department of Nanyang Model High School which was separated from the school in 2000.

In April 1950, Chairman Mao Zedong inscribed “Qing Feng” (Young Pioneer) for the wall-newspaper of senior one students. In 1956, the school became public school again and was renamed as Shanghai No. 71 High School.

In 1958, the name of the school was changed to Nanyang Model High School. In 1959, the school was appointed as one of the key schools in Shanghai.

In 2000, following the reform of the education system in Shanghai, the junior department of the school was closed and separated from the original campus and the school then became Shanghai Nanyang Model High School.

Names in history
Nanyang Model High School has the following different names in history:
 Elementary school affiliated to Nanyang Public School (1901–1927)
 Nanyang Model Elementary/Middle School (1927–1956) (Senior department of the school was opened in 1930.)
 Shanghai No. 71 High School (1956–1958)
 Shanghai Nanyang Model High School (1958–present)

Campus

School facilities
With the development of more than one hundred years, the school now has two campuses named “Lingling”, which is the main campus for Domestic Division from senior one to senior two, and “Tianyao”, the southern campus only for senior three students. The total area of the school is about 64 mu, including 25,000m2 school buildings and facilities and 5,000m2 grassland for sports and student activities. The school has a 400m-track playground, nine outdoor basketball courts, one soccer field, one modern gymnasium with four indoor basketball courts and badminton courts, one multifunctional theater, one conservatory hall and one T-hall, either of which can seat over 500 people. In addition, the school has many multimedia and multifunctional classrooms, laboratories and teachers’ offices.

Main school buildings

The Red Building
In 1938, the school moved from its previous location into 200 Tianping Road when there was only on red-brick villa named Hong Lou (the Red Building) on the campus for teaching. This new building is named after its prototype as a tribute to the school tradition.

Jing Xin Building
This building is named after the Chinese characters Jing and Xin (Devotion and Honesty) from the school mottos.
In 1910, Mr. Tang Wenzhi, then principal of Nanyang Public School, designated “Qin, Jian, Jing, Xin” (Diligence, Thrift, Devotion, and Honesty) as the four mottos of its elementary school, which also became the fundamental education philosophy of the school, as well as defined characteristics of every school student.

Shukui Building
This building is named in memory of Mr. Shen Qinghong, the school’s principal from 1911 to 1927, whose courtesy name was Shukui, and prename Xinggon. 
As an educationist, Mr. Shen Shikui was appointed principal of the former elementary school affiliated to Nanyang Public School in 1911, and devoted a lot to the foundation and development of the later Nanyang Model High School from then on. Mr. Shen was the founder of the modern school music education in China, and one of the first music teachers of the Chinese modern education.

Tongyi Building
This building is named in memory of Mr. Shen Weizhen, the former principal from 1927 to 1966, whose courtesy name was Tongyi.
In 1927, the former elementary school affiliated to Nanyang Public School was restructured to a private elementary and middle school. After the founding of the People’s Republic of China, Mr. Shen remained principal till his retirement in 1966. Being the school principal for 39 years and having worked in the school for 55 years, Mr. Shen’s contribution was beyond unparalleled.

Academics

Featured school programs
The International Division of Nanyang Model High School was established in September 2008 for two programs: OC Program and British Columbia (Canada) Offshore School Program:

OC Program
The main recruitment of OC Program is for Grade 10 to Grade 12 students from Hong Kong, Macao, Taiwan and foreign countries. Under the instruction of the Department of Chinese Ministry of Education, OC Chinese courses are provided to teach standard Chinese high school study materials and Shanghai PEP combination courses. The courses are taught in classes of no more than 30 students by the teachers of Nanyang Model High School Domestic Division. The students attend the Hong Kong, Macao, Taiwan joint examination and the entrance examination for foreign students held by Chinese universities.

British Columbia (BC) Offshore School Program
In the British Columbia (Canada) Offshore School Program, all students are registered with the BC Ministry of Education like Canadian students. The BC Ministry of Education has a strict control of the education quality and indicators in the system. Students in the BC program are required to have sufficient English language capabilities to either meet or exceed the curricular requirements when they enter the BC program. Students who do not meet the minimum English language requirements for entry into the BC program must not be admitted to the school.

All courses are selected by the BC Ministry of Education, taught by highly qualified foreign teachers who graduated from the University of British Columbia, Simon Fraser University and other well-known schools in Canada. All students in this program use textbooks approved by the BC Ministry of Education's curriculum management. The British Columbia Certificate of Graduation or "Dogwood Diploma" is awarded upon successful completion of the provincial graduation requirements. Each year, student recruiters, representatives, and advisers, coming from schools all across the Canada visit Nanyang Model High school with detailed application and admission information for the students and faculty. All the students have equal chances to talk to the directors and admission coordinators from the University of Toronto, McGill University, the University of Waterloo, the University of British Columbia and other well-known schools face-to-face, getting a chance to raise questions. The graduate students from the BC Program with high school diploma and credits can apply for post-secondary institutions in Canada, the United Kingdom, the United States, Australia and English-speaking schools in other countries like Sweden and Switzerland.

In September 2016, Nanyang Model Private High School's BC Program was honoured to have the Honourable Prime Minister Justin Trudeau visit the school with Yao Ming to coach a friendly basketball game.

Skills Development Program 
Skills Development Program in Nanmo is a new expending course for students’ critical thinking and study skills which is designed and validated by University of Cambridge International Examinations (CIE). The aims are to help students develop their critical thinking, teamwork, and leadership abilities; enhance students’ communication skills; and encourage students to be independent reflective learners through various ways of research and inquiry.

Sports

Sport is a major feature of Nanyang Model High School. Basketball has become a traditional event in Nanyang Model High School.

Since the school renaissance in 1979, Nanyang Model High School has won Shanghai senior high school basketball championship more than 80 times. The major achievements include runner-up of Chinese High School League in 2004, champion in 2005 Reebok National High School basketball Invitational Championship, Champion of the Thirteenth Shanghai Sports Meet in 2006, and champion of Shanghai Student Sports Meet in 2008. to dates, Nanyang Model High School Basketball Team has won over 70 champions in Shanghai and five national basketball championships. The school has also fostered the former China men's national basketball team captain Zhang Dawei, former China women's national basketball captain Zhu Jinyun and many well-known athletes.

In October 2007, The Shanghai High School Sports Association Basketball Working Committee was established as the first sports organizations founded by Chinese Student Sports Federation in Nanyang Model High School by the school principal Gao Yi as the director. The commission's mandate is gradually assume the Shanghai high school students in training, competition, research work. Since its inception, it has hosted the high school league in 2007, Li Ning Junior Basketball League, and the basketball training observe lessons held in Baoshan Shanghai traditional basketball school.

Nanmo Cup
Students in Nanyang Model High School hosted their own basketball tournament since 1982. The "Nanmo Cup" has been held every year since then and have 52 matches each season.

Music and arts

Student Art Troupe of Symphony Orchestra
The Student Art Troupe of Symphony Orchestra of Nanyang Model High School was founded in August 1992 by Mr. Cao Peng who is also the artistic director and Principal Conductor. The orchestra staff comprises professors from the Shanghai Conservatory of Music and senior performers of professional orchestra for each part.

Nanyang Model High School Student Symphony Orchestra regularly participates in the performance of the Shanghai Arts Festival, major social celebration, multiple performance and the exchange of secondary school students of the United States, Canada, Australia, Japan, Singapore and Hong Kong, Taiwan and other arts organizations.

The Symphony Orchestra also participates in the exhibitions and activities of the Shanghai World Expo, Taipei International Flora Exposition, and the 65th session of the Chicago World Music Festival exchange of performances. It has won the first, second, and third national primary and secondary school art festival first prize; the 15th Australian International Music Festival Gold Award; and the gold medal first place of the 35th International Youth and Music Festival, Vienna, Austria.

Aesthetic education
School aesthetic course experiment has been emphasized for 19 years. One of the important content in aesthetic lesson is the appreciation of the ten styles of arts, which has been the solid artistic constitution in Nanyang Model High School, as a support feature of the students’ personality of quality education. 
The school has been organizing art appreciation courses and activities for a long time. There is a variety of enriched content in this aesthetic course which stress both Chinese traditional culture and the mainstream western cultures. The student experiences range from the drama Shang Yang, En attendant Godot, the opera Eugene Onegin, the Kunqu, to ancient Egypt exhibition, Joan Miró’s Paintings, Auguste Rodin’s sculpture Exhibition, international photography exhibition, and Henry Moore’s sculpture exhibition. In this featured program at Nanmo, students have gained a broad aesthetic education that is rarely comparable in Shanghai's Experimental and Key Paradigm Schools.

School magazines
Nanyang Model News is the school's official published news with a regular monthly release. Nanyang Model High school also has other school publications such as The Alumni Newsletter, Teaching and Research, National Defense etc.

Principals in history
There have been 11 principals in the school's history:
Woo Tsin-hang (Wu Zhihui) (1901)   
Chen Maozhi  (1901-1904)  
Lin Kanghou  (1904-1911)  
Shen Shukui  (1911-1927)  
Shen Tongyi  (1927-1966)  
Zhu Jiaze  (1978-1979)  
Zhao Xianchu  (1979-1984)  
Yuan Yipei  (1989-1990)  
Zhang Maochang  (1990-2000)  
Qian Yaobang  (2001-2005)  
Gao Yi  (2005–present day) 

Notable alumni

For over a hundred years, nearly 40,000 students graduated from the school, including 5 selected to U.S. National Academy of Engineering, and 46 to Chinese Academy of Sciences and Chinese Academy of Engineering. They end up being university presidents, world champions, ambassadors, army generals, and martyrs (Chen Yuqin, Fang Nengji, Zhao Youguo) for the protection of a people.

 Zou Taofen (邹韬奋) reporter, publisher
 Zhang Guangdou (张光斗) specialist in hydraulic engineering
 Wang Xuan (王选) innovator of the Chinese printing industry
 Tang Xiaowei (唐孝威) physicist
 Chen Junliang (陈俊亮) specialist in communication network
 He Zuoxiu (何祚庥) physicist
 Nina Wang (龔如心)
 Larry Yung (荣智健) former chairman of CITIC Pacific
 Li Daoyu (李道豫) former Chinese ambassador to the U.S.
 Fu Lei (傅雷) translator
 Pai Hsien-yung (白先勇) writer

Business
Sheng Yudu (enrolled in 1924): in Japan, overseas Chinese entrepreneur, Tokyo Lingering Garden Co., Ltd. President, grandson of Sheng Xuanhuai
Yin Zhihao, ‘29: Taiwanese entrepreneur, Continental Engineering Corporation chairman, honorary chairman of Acer
Dan Sheng, ‘47: Europe trip prominent businessman, community leaders, all the British Overseas Chinese Association, president of China's reunification
Zhang Zhongmo, ‘48: Taiwanese entrepreneur, TSMC chairman, known as "godfather of Taiwan Semiconductor"
Gong Ruxin, ‘54: Hong Kong entrepreneur, Nanyang Model High School Alumni Association during his lifetime was the honorary president of the Hong Kong Branch
Cao Qiyong, ‘56: Hong Kong entrepreneur, Vice Chairman of Hong Kong Novel Enterprises Ltd., Guangbiao Cao's son
Rong Zhijian, ‘59: Hong Kong entrepreneur, former chairman of CITIC Pacific, the son of former Vice President Rong
Chen XiaoJin, ‘63: China Shipbuilding Group Corporation, the son of Chen Pixian
Chen Feilong : Taiwanese entrepreneur, Nan Chiau Group Chairman, former ROC legislator
Jiang Zhicheng (2004: Bo Yu Investment Consultants Limited, Jiang Sun

Military and politics 
Xu Mo, 1908: political scientist, jurist, former International Court of Justice, Republic of China ambassadors
Ye Gongchao (enrolled in 1911): the former ROC Minister of Foreign Affairs, Republic of China Ambassador, presidential advisor
Fei Hua, 1927: former Minister of Finance, Republic of China
Gu Dehuan, 1927: former vice governor of Zhejiang Province, Chinese Academy of Sciences Institute of Electronics, the first director
Zhou Jiannan, ‘34: former Minister of Machinery Industry, Republic of China
Zhang Liangqi, ‘41: former president of the National Defense University, with rank of Major General
He Kang, ‘42: former Minister of Agriculture, Republic of China
Cecilia Yen Koo, ‘44: the Republic of China presidential advisor, Women's Federation, chairman of the Council, the wife of former SEF chairman Gu Chenfu
Xu Weicheng, ‘47: the former Deputy Minister of Propaganda, chief editor of Encyclopedia of China Publishing House
Li Ruiqian, ‘47 term: the former Dean of Engineering, the PLA Air Force, Air Force major general
Li Daoyu, ‘49: the former Chinese Ambassador to the U.S., China's Permanent Representative to the UN
Ma Qingxiong, ‘50: the former State Vice Minister of Radio, Film and Television
Xu Jingxian, ‘51: the former Shanghai Revolutionary Committee, deputy director of Shanghai Municipal Party Committee Secretary
Li Longcheng, ‘56: the former Vice Chairman of Shanxi Province
Chen Haosu, ‘59: The Chinese People's Association for Friendship with Foreign Countries, the son of Marshal Chenyi
Gong Xinhan, ‘59: the former Deputy Minister of Propaganda
Wang Guangtao, ‘60: the former Minister of Construction
Gan Yisheng, ‘64: deputy secretary of the Central Commission for Discipline Inspection
Li Yuanchao, ‘66: Vice President of the People's Republic of China

Technology 
Hu Mingfu, 1903: China's first mathematics Ph.D., founder of the Science Society of China
Hu Gangfu, 1903: China one of the founders of modern physics
Hou Kun, ‘03: the father of Chinese typewriter, America's first master's degree graduates in aeronautical engineering
Fu Huanguang, ‘09: forest scientist, a founder of the Chinese cause soil and water conservation
Li Ximou, ‘10: motors experts, former Taiwan Provincial Museum, National Chiao Tung University
Zhu Linwu, ‘18: Thermal engineering expert, former director of Jiao Tong University, Department of Engineering Physics, Head of Ship Power
Gu Yuquan, ‘19: textile machinery manufacturing expert, former national director of the Central Industrial test, KMT Central Committee Commission Vice Chairman, CPPCC National Committee
Tong Daxun, ‘23: Railway engineering experts, China's "Railway Engineering" discipline one of the pioneers
Zhang Guangdou, ‘27: Water Resources and Hydropower Engineering experts, Chinese Academy of Sciences, Chinese Academy of Engineering, Nanyang Model High School Alumni Association is currently Honorary President
Hu Shihua, ‘27: mathematical logician, Chinese Academy of Sciences
Huang Xichun, ‘33: electromagnetic theory and technical expert, China transient electromagnetic fields and electromagnetic waves of the troposphere pioneer
Feng Xianpei, ‘34: Railway public works expert, the Chinese railway pioneers of heavy rail
Feng Jizhong, ‘35: architect, the founder of Chinese urban planning
Guo Dunren, ‘35: physicist, professor at Peking University, bridge "generous slice bid law," the inventor
Hu Hanquan, ‘36: vacuum electronics experts, China's main microwave vacuum electronic devices one of the pioneers
Li Zhifang, ‘36: chemical fiber expert, China One of the founders of chemical engineering
Li Tianhe, ‘39: Chinese electrical scientist, MIT professor, the U.S. National Academy of Engineering, foreign academician of Chinese Academy of Engineering
Hu Xuchu, ‘40: physiologist, former deputy director of Chinese Academy of Sciences Shanghai Institutes for Biological Sciences
Zhuang Fenggan, ‘42: aerodynamicists, Chinese Academy of Sciences, Fellow of International Academy of Astronautics
Tang Nianci, ‘42: geotechnical engineering experts, the Chinese founder of the pile dynamics
Jiang Shifei, ‘42: a computer expert, former Chinese Academy of Sciences Shenyang Institute of Computing Technology
Dou Zulie, ‘43: a computer expert, Academia Sinica
Xu Xiaobai, ‘44: chemist, Chinese Academy of Sciences
He Zuoxiu, ‘45: physicist, philosopher, Chinese Academy of Sciences
Ge Shouren, ‘45: the former Dean of Engineering, University of California, Berkeley, U.S. National Academy of Engineering, Academia Sinica, foreign academician of Chinese Academy of Sciences
Li Gao, ‘45: the former president of Shanghai University of Engineering Sciences, the first dean of China Europe International Business School
Tian Changzhuo, ‘45: aviation expert, former chief architect of the Boeing Company
Yang Fuyu, ‘46: biochemist, Chinese Academy of Sciences
Xu Daxiong, ‘46: physicist, Beijing University of Posts and Telecommunications, honorary president of Century College, the Kyrgyz foreign academician of National Academy of Sciences
Chen Huaijin, ‘46: rocket expert, former Chief Engineer of the Chinese Ministry of Space Industry, the IAF Vice President, International Astronautical Academy of Sciences
Zhu Yongxun, ‘47: nuclear, chemical experts, Chinese Academy of Engineering
Gu Songfen, ‘47: Aircraft designer, Chinese Academy of Sciences, Chinese Academy of Engineering, "the father of J-8"
Wu Chengkang, ‘47: high-temperature gas mechanics, Chinese Academy of Sciences
Hua Tongwen, ‘47: chemical educator, professor at Peking University
Xu Qingrui, ‘47: management scientist, Chinese Academy of Engineering
Qiu Dahong, ‘47: coastal and offshore engineer, Chinese Academy of Sciences
Zheng Xuyun, ‘47: Chinese experts in tribology, the U.S. National Academy of Engineering
Gu Weilian, ‘48: agronomist, former president of Shenyang Agricultural University, Gu Yuxiu son
Tang Xiaowei, ‘49: physicist, hydrogen bomb, atomic bomb hero, Chinese Academy of Sciences
Pan Junhua, ‘49: Astronomical optics expert, Chinese Academy of Engineering
He Yuqi, ‘50: Chinese experts in control theory, Harvard University, the U.S. National Academy of Engineering, Chinese Academy of Sciences, Chinese Academy of Engineering Foreign Member
Ni Weidou, ‘50: Mechanical engineering experts, Chinese Academy of Sciences
Ruan Xueyu, ‘50: pressure processing experts, the Chinese Academy of Engineering
Xu Zhongyu, ‘50: materials scientist, former Vice President of Hunan University, Changsha University chancellor
Chen Junliang, ‘51: Communications and electronics expert, Chinese Academy of Sciences, Chinese Academy of Engineering
Shen Zuyan, ‘51: steel expert, Chinese Academy of Engineering
Xie Youbai, ‘51: engineer, Chinese Academy of Engineering
Zhang Jigao, ‘51: electrical contact expert, the Chinese electrical contact one of the pioneers of disciplines
Dai Kerong, ‘52: biomechanics experts, Chinese Academy of Engineering
Wang Xun, ‘52: physicist, Chinese Academy of Sciences
Cao Chunxiao, ‘52: Material scientists, Chinese Academy of Sciences, China research co-founder of the titanium
Chen Junshi, ‘52: Nutrition and food safety experts, the Chinese Academy of Engineering
Zhong Wanxie, ‘52: the calculation mechanics, Chinese Academy of Sciences
 Ge Xiurun, ‘52: Rock mechanics experts, Chinese Academy of Engineering
Yuan Quan, ‘52: chemical engineering scientists, Chinese Academy of Sciences
Shen Yuanrang, ‘52: Chinese physicist, U.S. National Academy of Sciences, Academia Sinica, foreign academician of Chinese Academy of Sciences
Fei Lin, ‘53: Architect, Zhongyuan International Engineering Design & Research Institute chief architect, professor at Tsinghua University
Xiang Kunsan, ‘53: physician, Chinese Academy of Engineering
Le Weisong, ‘53: The original Shanghai Aviation Industrial School
Wang Xuan, ‘54: a computer expert, founder of Chinese laser typesetting system, Chinese Academy of Sciences, Chinese Academy of Engineering, former Vice Chairman of CPPCC
Zhang Gongqing, ‘54: mathematician, Chinese Academy of Sciences, the Third World Academy of Sciences
Ding Shizhao, ‘55: Project Management Specialist, Project Management Institute of Peking University and honorary director of the British Royal Institution of Chartered senior construction engineer
Yang Shiqin, ‘56: the former president of Harbin Institute of Technology
Wang Yifei, ‘57: Embryologist, former president of Shanghai Second Medical University
Song Baoyun, ‘57: the former vice president of Dalian Railway, China's continuous extrusion technology, one of the founders
Xing Tonghe, ‘57: Architect, Shanghai Modern Architectural Design Group chief architect, architectural design of the Shanghai World Expo Center
Wang Shenghong, ‘59: the former president of Peking University
Weng Zuze, ‘59: the former Hunan University
Wang Zhenxi, ‘59: expert of magnetic and amorphous materials, Chinese Academy of Engineering
Yuan Jie, ‘82: space science expert, deputy general manager of China Aerospace Science and Technology Corporation, the IAF Vice President

Literature, history and economics 
Chen Yuan, ‘10: writer, former Dean of Wuhan University, first representative in UNESCO on behalf of the Republic of China
Zhu Dongrun, ‘10: biography writer, literary historian, a pioneer of modern Chinese literature, biographies, original Chinese Department of Peking University
Zou Taofen, ‘13: well-known correspondent, publisher
Du Dingyou, ‘14: library scientists, China one of the pioneers of modern librarianship
Tang Qingzeng, ‘17: historians of economic thought, Jiaotong University, son of Tang Wenzhi
Fei Gong, ‘18: professor of Zhejiang University
Fu Lei (enrolled in 1920): well-known literary translator
Zhou Lianhua (enrolled in 1932): Taiwan's well-known theologian
Hua Yan, ‘44: Taiwan's well-known writer, Yan Fu's granddaughter, sister of Yen Cho-yun
Bai Xianyong (enrolled in 1947): Taiwanese writer, son of Bai Chongxi, general in the National Revolutionary Army of the Republic of China
Xia Yulong, ‘46: Shanghai Academy of Social Sciences
Li Yining, ‘47: economist, Dean of Peking University Guanghua School of Management
Zhou Erliu, ‘48: Professor of Sociology, former vice president of Peking University, nephew of Zhou Enlai
Chen Qineng, ‘52: historian, honorary academician Academy of Social Sciences
Zhao Xiaqiu, ‘53: writer, professor of Renmin University of China, mother of Phoenix Television host Zeng Zimo
Zhou Huijun, ‘58: calligrapher, President of Shanghai Calligraphers Association, Vice President of Chinese Calligraphers Association

Art and sports 
Wan Jin, ‘37: Chinese photographer, former president of the Canada-China Friendship Association
Zhang Banglun, ‘38: China footballer
Fei Mingyi, ‘48: well-known Hong Kong singer
Zhou Liangliang, ‘50: performing artists, actors at the national level
Sun Yue, ‘52: Peking Opera stars, older students work
Wei Jizhong, ‘54: The former Secretary-General of the Chinese Olympic Committee, former Chinese Olympic Committee Vice President, 2000 Olympic Committee Secretary General
Wei Zongwan, ‘55: National Class One Performer
Hu Zhifeng, ‘56: Peking Opera, Chinese Opera Society performance
Pan Yifei, ‘57: the former vice president of Central Conservatory of Music
Hu Zurong, ‘60: pole vaulter, had five break the national record, the Chinese Paralympic Sports Association Vice President
Zuo Zhenguan, ‘63: Russian-Chinese composer, Russian Philharmonic Orchestra
Zhang Dawei, ‘66: The original Chinese team captain, head coach of China women's basketball
Yan Xiaopin, ‘82: Film actor
Gu Wei, ‘88: Swedish-Chinese dancers, MD
Yan Hua, ‘97: Shanghai Oriental TV host

References

External links
 Nanyang Model High School Official Website
 Official Website of Nanyang Model Private High School's BC Program

Schools in Shanghai
High schools in Shanghai